The 2023 Men's EuroHockey Championship II will be the tenth edition of the Men's EuroHockey Championship II, the second level of the men's European field hockey championships organized by the European Hockey Federation. It will be held from 23 to 29 July 2023 in Dublin, Ireland.

Qualification
The eight teams qualified based on their performance in the 2023 Men's EuroHockey Championship Qualifiers, with the runners-up and third-placed teams qualifiying for the Championship II.

See also
 2023 Men's EuroHockey Championship
 2023 Men's EuroHockey Championship III
 2023 Women's EuroHockey Championship II

References

EuroHockey Championship II
Men 2
International field hockey competitions hosted by Ireland
EuroHockey Championship II
EuroHockey Championship II
International sports competitions in Dublin (city)
2020s in Dublin (city)